The Mercedes-Benz W222 is the sixth generation of the S-Class produced from 2013 to 2020, the successor of the W221 S-Class and the predecessor of the W223 S-Class. The W222 was designed during 2009. The original design proposal of the car was created by Il-hun Yoon, a Korean designer, who was inspired by the Mercedes-Benz F700 concept car. The exterior design was developed by a team of designers under the direction of Robert Lešnik. W222 has a similar design theme to the C-Class (W205) and  E-Class (W213).

In Europe, sales of the S 400 Hybrid, S 350 BlueTEC, S 350 BlueTEC Hybrid, and S 500 began in September 2013. US sales of the S 550 also began in September; the 4Matic four-wheel drive model went on sale in November 2013. Additional models, including V12 models and those from AMG were released in 2014.

The newest S-Class debuted on 15 May 2013 in Hamburg, Germany and entered production in Sindelfingen, Germany in June 2013.

The production of W222 ended in September 2020 with the introduction of its successor, S-Class (W223), which made its world premiere on 2 September 2020 at the brand-new Factory 56 in Sindelfingen.

Suspension 

Mercedes' hydropneumatic, active suspension Active Body Control has been updated with a system dubbed Magic Body Control (MBC) that is fitted with a road-sensing system ("Road surface scan") that pre-scans the road for uneven surfaces, potholes and bumps. Magic Body Control is not available on any of the 4-Matic models, as of Model Year 2017.

Models 

The vehicle was unveiled at Airbus in Hamburg-Finkenwerder. followed by Shanghai's Mercedes-Benz Arena, and the 2013 Osaka Motor Show (S 400 HYBRID). The new S-Class has been available to order since the middle of May 2013 with official arrival at Mercedes-Benz dealers on 20 July 2013. Early models included S 400 Hybrid, S 500, S 350 BlueTEC, followed by S 300 BlueTEC Hybrid in early 2014.

US models went on sale as 2014 model year vehicles; the lineup initially included only the long-wheelbase "S 550" (S 500 in Europe) in September 2013, and long-wheelbase S 550 4Matic which arrived in November 2013. Auto Bild measured the LWB as the quietest among cars like Rolls-Royce Ghost and Bentley Flying Spur in 2014. Additional models, including V12 models and those from AMG arrived in early 2014.

Europe models went on sale at the end of July 2013, followed by China at the end of September 2013, the USA in October 2013.

Japan models went on sale and delivery began in November 2013. Early models include the S 400 Hybrid (right-hand-drive), S 400 Hybrid Exclusive (right steering), S 550 long (left/right steering), S 63 AMG long (right steering), S 63 AMG 4Matic long (left-hand-drive). The S 300 BlueTEC HYBRID, S 350 BlueTEC 4MATIC, S 600, and S 65 AMG Saloon arrived at dealer showrooms in March 2014.

There is also the "S 500 Intelligent Drive", which is a self-driving version of the S 500 sedan, using sensors that are also available in the production version of the S-Class. The car uses the sensors to capture the massive amounts of data in traffic. The vehicle was unveiled in the 2013 Frankfurt Motor Show.

S 63 AMG, S 63 AMG 4MATIC (2013–2020) 

Other features include AMG door sill panels, AMG floor mats, AMG sports pedals in brushed stainless steel with rubber studs, Ambient lighting, Attention Assist, Collision Prevention Assist, COMAND Online, 10 loudspeakers with Frontbass, Metallic paintwork, Pre-Safe Plus, Tyre pressure loss warning system, LED High-Performance headlamps, DISTRONIC PLUS (Driving Assistance package Plus, Night View Assist Plus).

AMG Performance Studio options include AMG Exterior Carbon-Fibre package, AMG ceramic high-performance composite brake system, AMG carbon-fibre engine cover, AMG performance steering wheel in black Nappa leather / DINAMICA, AMG trim in carbon fibre/black piano lacquer, red brake callipers.

Other options include Air-Balance package, Burmester surround sound system, Burmester high-end 3D surround sound system, Business Telephony in the rear, Chauffeur package, designo appointments packages, Executive seat, Exclusive package, First-Class rear suite, Folding tables in the rear, LED Intelligent Light System, Seat Comfort package including ENERGIZING massage function, Warmth Comfort package.

The vehicles were unveiled in the 2013 Frankfurt Motor Show and were set to go on sale in September 2013.

S 65 AMG (2014–2019) 

AMG Performance Studio options include AMG Exterior Carbon-Fibre package, AMG ceramic high-performance composite braking system, AMG performance steering wheel in Nappa leather/DINAMICA (black), AMG trim in carbon-fibre/black piano lacquer, red brake callipers.

Other options include 360° camera, Business Telephony in the rear, designo appointments packages, executive seat, First-Class rear suite, Individual Entertainment System in the rear, folding tables in the rear, Warmth Comfort package.

The vehicle was unveiled in the 2013 Los Angeles International Auto Show and the 2013 Tokyo Motor Show, followed by the 2013 Osaka Motor Show.

The vehicle was set to go on sale in March 2014.

On 24 February 2019, Mercedes-Benz announced the S 65 Final Edition with a limited run of 130 units and unveiled the final edition at the Geneva Auto Salon on 2 March 2019. This will end the era of the V12 engine in the Mercedes-AMG model; however, the M279 V12 engine could continue in Mercedes-Benz S 600 as well as Mercedes-Maybach S 650 (S 680 for the Chinese market) and possible GLS 680 for the foreseeable time. The Final Edition is finished in Obsidian Black metallic paint with bronze highlights in the front and rear bumpers and underneath the doors as well as bronze-coloured 20-inch alloy wheels. The special AMG emblems are affixed to the C-pillars. The interior is trimmed in black Exclusive Nappa leather, with special carbon ornamental elements, and bronze-stitching black foot mats. Production ended in November 2019.

S 500 e (2014–2017) 

The all electric range is about  under the New European Driving Cycle.

The EPA, under its five-cycle tests, rated the 2015 model year S 500 e energy consumption in all-electric mode at 59 kWh per 100 miles, which translates into a combined city/highway fuel economy of 58 miles per gallon gasoline equivalent (MPG-e) (4.1 L/100 km; 70 mpg−imp gasoline equivalent).

The production vehicle was unveiled in Toronto in 2013, followed by the 2013 Frankfurt Motor Show. The U.S. launch is slated for early 2015. A total of 17 units have been registered in Germany . According to JATO Dynamics, a total of 38 units have been registered in Europe through September 2014.

S 600 
The vehicle was unveiled in the 2014 North American International Auto Show. The vehicle went on sale in March 2014.

Mercedes-Maybach 

In 2015, Mercedes brought back the Maybach name as a sub-brand of the Mercedes lineup, representing advanced luxury. The first model produced was the Mercedes-Maybach S-Class, designed to be pitched against the Bentley Mulsanne and Rolls-Royce Phantom VIII.

The Mercedes-Maybach is available as S 500 and S 600 models (the US received Mercedes-Maybach S 550 4MATIC and S 600 models, with the S 550 having the same 4.7L engine as the S 500 Mercedes-Maybach elsewhere), with 4MATIC optional with the V8 engine and V12 for the latter. Mercedes also claims that the S Class is the world's quietest production car. The basic car has colour options, and the choice between a rear bench seat or 2 reclining rear seats. Options include air-conditioned, heated and massaging seats; heated armrests; a system to pump agarwood scent, ionised air around the cabin; First class suite for the rear cabin and a 24-speaker, 1,540 watt Burmester High-End 3D surround sound system.

The Maybach S 500 assembly started in Pune, India in September 2015 and is the second country to produce a Maybach.

In 2017 with the facelift S 600 was discontinued, while S 650 introduced (with the engine of former S 65 AMG).

The Mercedes-Maybach S 600 and S 650 were also available in a Pullman version, a chauffeur-driven sedan which includes a partition-separated ultra-luxurious rear passenger compartment with two sets of paired facing seats.  This version is equipped with the V12 dual-turbocharger gasoline engine, the seven-speed automatic transmission, and rear-wheel drive. The same vehicle is additionally available as an armoured version, known as the Pullman Guard.

At the 2017 Shanghai Motor Show, a new Chinese-only Mercedes-Maybach S 680 was introduced for the model year 2018 and onward. The number 8 is very auspicious in China and Asian countries, closely associated with luck and wealth. S 680 is essentially the same as S 650 in equipment level and such.

Specifications

Engines (2013–2017) 

 With optional extra-cost AMG Driver Package
 Badged as S 400 HYBRID, S 500 PLUG-IN HYBRID, S 350 BlueTEC, S 350 BlueTEC 4MATIC and S 300 BlueTEC HYBRID before 2015

Transmission (2013–2017)

W222 facelift (2017–2020) 

A mid-cycle refresh was introduced in the summer 2017 for the 2018 model year. The refresh introduces the new 48-volt integrated starter/alternator, ENERGIZING Comfort Control, updated autonomous driving technologies. The grille is updated to differentiate between six and eight cylinder engine versions and long wheelbase and V12 versions. The headlamps and taillamps are revised with new enhanced LED technology.

The new range of six-cylinder inline petrol and diesel engines are offered with electrification (20 kilowatts/22 horsepower). This marks the return of six-cylinder inline engines to the S-Class since the last one was offered in 2005. The sole gas V6 engine is in the S 560 e with a plug-in hybrid system. The four-cylinder inline engine with a hybrid system (S 300 h) was removed from the S-Class model range. Additionally, the old 4.7-litre V8 petrol engine is replaced by the new AMG-engineered 4.0-litre biturbo V8, consolidating the V8 engine range to one size now. 2019 marks the final year of S 65 AMG with 130 units to be finished in obsidian black metallic paint with bronze highlights on the body and alloy wheels. However, the 6.0-litre V12 AMG carries on in Maybach S 650 after the production end of S 65 AMG. Only S 600 continues unchanged.

Inline 6 and V8 engines are now paired with the 9-speed 9G-TRONIC automatic transmission (AMG Speedshift MCT for S 63 AMG 4MATIC+) while V12 engines continue to use the 7G-TRONIC PLUS transmission.

S 63 AMG 4MATIC+ became the sole choice for the V8 version of S-Class from AMG, eliminating the previous rear-wheel-drive version.

Engines (2017–2020)

With optional extra cost AMG Driver's Package

Transmission (2017–2020)

References

External links 

 Official website for the W222 S-Class
Press kit:
 The S-Class: The aspiration - the best car in the world
Press kit (2017 facelift): 
The new Mercedes-Benz S-Class: The automotive benchmark in efficiency and comfort

S-Class
Sedans
Cars introduced in 2013
W222
All-wheel-drive vehicles
Rear-wheel-drive vehicles
Full-size vehicles
Luxury vehicles
Plug-in hybrid vehicles
Limousines
2020s cars